Castilleja nubigena is a species of plant in the family Orobanchaceae. It is endemic to Ecuador.

References

Endemic flora of Ecuador
nubigena
Least concern plants
Taxonomy articles created by Polbot